Yeonsan Station is a station of the Busan Metro Line 1 and Busan Metro Line 3 in Yeonsan-dong, Yeonje District, Busan, South Korea.

Station Layout

Line 1

Line 3

Gallery

External links
  Cyber station information from Busan Transportation Corporation

Busan Metro stations
Yeonje District
Railway stations in South Korea opened in 1985